Richard Ashley may refer to:
Richard Ashley (musician) (1774–1836), English musician
Richard Ashley (cricketer) (1902–1974), British cricketer
Richard K. Ashley, American international relations scholar